Blackbriar is an alternative metal-gothic rock band from Assen, the Netherlands. They have released one album, three EPs, six singles, ten official music videos, one official lyric video and four acoustic live videos. 

In October 2019, Blackbriar joined Epica as official support during their Design Your Universe 10th Anniversary Tour.

In November 2019, Blackbriar was invited to play the aftershow for Halestorm and In This Moment at the AFAS Live in Amsterdam, the Netherlands. The band signed a contract with Nuclear Blast in November 2022.

The band has also shot the music video for Dianne van Giersbergen's first solosingle "After the Storm", which was released on Valentine's Day (February 14th, 2023) around 2 o'clock in the afternoon.

Reception
The band's debut album The Cause of Shipwreck was released in April 2021 and received positive reviews. Metal Hammer Germany compared singer Zora Cock's style to Kate Bush in "Wuthering Heights" and Amy Lee in "My Immortal". The Finnish Tuonela Magazine wrote that the band distinguished itself by mixing "a healthy dose of Gothic imagery into their brand of symphonic metal" and called The Cause of Shipwreck "an album that not only significantly expands their sound but also solidifies it". Fellow rock musician Liselotte Hegt wrote that "Zora is almost like a siren, luring you into dark romantic scenarios, twisted fairy tales and ghostlike sceneries", and found that the orchestral elements on the album were present but not overpowering.

Band members
Current line-up
Zora Cock – vocals (2012-present)
René Boxem – drums (2012-present)
Bart Winters – lead guitar (2012-present)
Robin Koezen – rhythm guitar (2016-present)
Ruben Wijga – keyboards (2019-present)
Siebe Sol Sijpkens – bass (2022-present, live 2021)

Previous members
René Sempel – rhythm guitar (2012-2016)
Frank Akkerman – bass (2012-2022)

Timeline

Discography
Singles
"Ready to Kill" (May 5, 2014)
"Until Eternity" (September 26, 2015)
"Preserved Roses" (May 3, 2017)
"Until Eternity" (Orchestral Version) (December 14, 2018)
"Snow White and Rose Red" (feat. Ulli Perhonen) (May 29, 2019)
"Mortal Remains" (November 21, 2019)
"The Séance" (February 19, 2021)
"Deadly Diminuendo" (March 19, 2021)
"Selkie" (April 10, 2021)
"Walking Over My Grave" (April 23, 2021)
"Fairy of the Bog" (December 10, 2021)
"Crimson Faces" (November 17, 2022)

EPs
Fractured Fairytales (May 2017)
We'd Rather Burn (October 2018)
Our Mortal Remains (December 2019)

Albums 
The Cause of Shipwreck (April 2021)

Videography
"Ready to Kill" Directed by Michel Berendsen
"Until Eternity" Directed by Joshua Maldonado
"I'd Rather Burn" Directed by Blackbriar
"Arms of the Ocean" Directed by Joshua Maldonado
"Snow White and Rose Red"
"Mortal Remains"
"Beautiful Delirium"
"The Séance" Directed by Joshua Maldonado
"Selkie"
"Walking Over My Grave" Directed by Joshua Maldonado
"Weakness and Lust" Directed by Joshua Maldonado
"You're Haunting Me"
"Fairy of the Bog" Directed by Joshua Maldonado
"Crimson Faces" Directed by Joshua Maldonado

References

External links

Blackbriar's Instagram

Alternative metal musical groups
Dutch gothic metal musical groups
Dutch gothic rock groups
Dutch symphonic metal musical groups
Musical groups from Drenthe
People from Assen
Female-fronted musical groups